Püünsi is a village in Viimsi Parish, Harju County in northern Estonia. Püünsi has a population of 1,234 (as of 1 January 2011).

On 10 August 2005 a Copterline helicopter on Tallinn–Helsinki route crashed about 3 km west of Püünsi into the Tallinn Bay. All 14 people on the helicopter died.

References

External links
Püünsi School 

Villages in Harju County